High-speed rail in Iran may refer to:

 Arak-Qom High Speed Rail
 Tehran–Qom–Isfahan High Speed Rail